Brian Wade Anderson (born May 19, 1993) is an American professional baseball third baseman for the Milwaukee Brewers of Major League Baseball (MLB). He made his MLB debut in 2017 with the Miami Marlins. Anderson played college baseball for the Arkansas Razorbacks.

Amateur career
Anderson attended Deer Creek High School in Edmond, Oklahoma and was drafted by the Minnesota Twins in the 20th round of the 2011 MLB draft. He did not sign with the Twins and enrolled at the University of Arkansas, where he played college baseball for the Arkansas Razorbacks.

Anderson contributed as a freshman during the 2012 Razorbacks season. Anderson played 47 games, mixed among second base, third base, and right field for the Hogs, hitting .283 with 2 home runs and 11 RBI. The Razorbacks reached the 2012 College World Series and ended the season ranked #3 nationally.

In 2013, he played collegiate summer baseball with the Hyannis Harbor Hawks of the Cape Cod Baseball League.

During Anderson's junior season at Arkansas, the 2014 Razorbacks finished 40–25 and were eliminated in the NCAA Tournament Regionals. Anderson hit .328 and played third base and right field.

Professional career

Miami Marlins

Minor leagues
After his junior year, the Miami Marlins selected Anderson in the third round of the 2014 MLB draft. Anderson made his professional debut with the Batavia Muckdogs of the Class A-Short Season New York-Penn League and was promoted to the Greensboro Grasshoppers of the Class A South Atlantic League after 20 games. In 59 total games between the two teams, he slashed .300/.363/.496 with 11 home runs and 49 RBIs.

In 2015, Anderson played for the Jupiter Hammerheads of the Class A-Advanced Florida State League where he batted .235 with eight home runs and 62 RBIs in 132 games. After the regular season, he played in the Arizona Fall League.

In 2016, Anderson played for both Jupiter and the Jacksonville Suns of the Class AA Southern League where he compiled a combined .265 batting average with 11 home runs, 65 RBIs, and 21 doubles in 135 games between the two teams. He was named the Marlins Minor League Player of the Year. He played in the Arizona Fall League after the season for the second consecutive year.

In 2017, Anderson spent the season with both Jacksonville and the New Orleans Baby Cakes of the Class AAA International League, batting .275 with 22 home runs, 81 RBIs, and an .853 OPS in 120 games. Midway through the season, Anderson represented the Marlins in the 2017 All-Star Futures Game.

Major Leagues
On September 1, 2017, the Marlins promoted Anderson to MLB from New Orleans, and he made his MLB debut that day.

In 2018, Anderson started the season with the Marlins at third base. He hit his first career home run on April 2, 2018, off Boston Red Sox pitcher Brian Johnson at Marlins Park. He led all Marlins players in games played (156), plate appearances (670) and runs scored (87). His season earned him mention as a possible National League Rookie of the Year contender, ultimately won by Ronald Acuña Jr.

In 2019, During his second full MLB season, Anderson set career highs in home runs (20), runs batted in (66) and OPS (.811). He also performed well defensively, totaling nine outfield assists in only 55 appearances in right field. On August 23, he fractured his left fifth metacarpal when he was hit by a pitch in the bottom of the third inning. The injury did not require surgery, but ended his season prematurely.

On August 5, 2020, Anderson started at first base for the first time in his MLB career. In 2020, on defense he led NL third basemen in errors, with nine. On offense, Anderson slashed .255/.345/.465 with 11 home runs and 38 RBI in 200 at-bats.

On June 14, 2021, Anderson was placed on the 60-day injured list with a left shoulder subluxation. On September 10, Anderson underwent season-ending shoulder surgery.

On March 22, 2022, Anderson signed a $4.475 million contract with the Marlins, avoiding salary arbitration. Anderson appeared in 98 games for Miami in 2022, slashing .222/.311/.346 with 8 home runs and 28 RBI. On November 18, he was non-tendered and became a free agent.

Milwaukee Brewers
On January 23, 2023, Anderson signed a one-year, $3.5 million contract with the Milwaukee Brewers.

References

External links

1993 births
Living people
Arkansas Razorbacks baseball players
Baseball players from Oklahoma
Batavia Muckdogs players
Greensboro Grasshoppers players
Hyannis Harbor Hawks players
Jacksonville Jumbo Shrimp players
Jacksonville Suns players
Jupiter Hammerheads players
Major League Baseball right fielders
Major League Baseball third basemen
Mesa Solar Sox players
Miami Marlins players
New Orleans Baby Cakes players
Sportspeople from Edmond, Oklahoma
Lakeshore Chinooks players